Soundvision: In Stereo is the debut album from Detroit hip hop duo Lawless Element, released September 20, 2005 on Babygrande Records. The album is produced by group member Magnif, with additional instrumentals and production supplied by J Dilla & Young RJ and Madlib. Guest appearances come from Dilla, Melanie Rutherford, Phat Kat, Big Tone and Diverse. The duo's earlier singles, "The Shining" and "High" are both featured here, as well as the single "Rules Pt. 2" and remixed versions of their past tracks "Represent" and "...Something".

Track listing

2005 debut albums
Midwest hip hop albums
Albums produced by J Dilla
Albums produced by Madlib
Babygrande Records albums